The Toyota 200 presented by CK Power is a NASCAR Camping World Truck Series race at World Wide Technology Raceway at Gateway (formerly Gateway Motorsports Park). The race has been held each year since 1998 except for 2011, 2012 and 2013. The track closed after the 2010 race, reopened in 2012 under new ownership, and the race returned to the schedule in 2014.

Race history

Rick Carelli won the first truck race at Gateway.  A year later Greg Biffle won the first night race for the series at Gateway.  In 2000, the race date was moved to May, and the time of race was once again day. Jack Sprague not only won that race, but holds the average speed record for the event to this day. A year later Ted Musgrave won the event after showers moved the race back into the evening.

In 2004, the NASCAR Craftsman truck was using its version of the green-white-checkered rule, which stated that every race must end under green, for the last time.  With five laps left in the race Jack Sprague cut a tire bringing out the caution.  Caution would come out.  On the first green-white-checkered attempt a wreck in turn 1 brought the yellow flag out again.  The very next green flag saw first and second position drivers, Shane Hmiel and Bobby Hamilton get together bringing the yellow out again.  On the second attempt on the back straightway, Rick Crawford's truck was involved in an accident that had the truck sliding on its side against the wall.  On the fourth attempt, David Starr came out on top in a race with a record for most green-white-checkered laps and most attempts. Shortly thereafter NASCAR adopted a universal green-white-checkered rule for all three of its major series which said that if the caution flag comes out at any time during the green-white-checkered run the race will end under caution.

NASCAR-sanctioned events stopped being run at the track after the 2010 season when Dover Motorsports shut down the circuit at the end of the 2010 season.  The circuits were sold to former club racer and INDYCAR Indy Lights driver Curtis Francois in 2011, who promptly brought back the NHRA tour in 2012. Francois and NASCAR successfully negotiated the Truck Series return on June 14, 2014.

During the 2016 race, Spencer Gallagher and John Wes Townley crashed in turn one and got into a fight after climbing out of their trucks.

In March 2018, CK Power was announced as the new presenting sponsor for the race (which they remain to this day), and in June, Villa Lighting and Eaton Electrical Products were announced as that year's title sponsors. CarShield became the title sponsor in 2019 and returned in 2020. Toyota (specifically their dealerships in or near St. Louis) became the title sponsor for the 2021 race at the track, which was the first time that it was the opening race of the Truck Series playoffs.

Past winners

2004, 2009, 2021, and 2022: The race was extended due to a NASCAR Overtime finish; 2004 took four attempts.
2010: The race was postponed from Friday night to Saturday afternoon due to power outage and was Susposed to be the last race at Gateway .
2020: Race postponed from August 21 to August 30 due to schedule changes resulting from the COVID-19 pandemic.

Multiple winners (drivers)

Multiple winners (teams)

Manufacturer wins

References

External links
 

NASCAR Truck Series races